András Jeles (born 27 March 1945) is a Hungarian film director and actor. He is best known for directing the 1984 film The Annunciation. His son László Nemes is also a film director.

References

External links 

1945 births
Living people
Hungarian male film actors
Hungarian film directors